Oh Sang-jin (born February 15, 1980) is a South Korean former news anchor, television personality, and actor.

Career
He joined MBC in 2006, and became one of the network's most popular news anchors and TV show hosts. A member of the reporters' union, Oh was an outspoken critic of MBC's management, which he claimed compromised journalistic independence by keeping close ties with the Lee Myung-bak government. When Oh took part in the broadcasters' strike of 2012, MBC removed him from all its news and entertainment programs for the rest of that year, and he resigned from the network in 2013. Now a freelancer, Oh continued his television and hosting career. He also began acting, with roles in the television dramas My Love from the Star, Sweden Laundry and The Family Is Coming. 

In February 2017 it was announced that Oh joined YG Entertainment.

In April 2019, Oh left YG Entertainment and signed with new agency IOK Company.

Filmography

Variety show

Television series

Film

Hosting

Ambassadorship 
 Ambassador of Public Relations to Seoul (2023)

Awards and nominations

References

External links

1980 births
Living people
South Korean announcers
South Korean male television actors
South Korean television presenters
Yonsei University alumni
People from Ulsan
Haeju Oh clan